Rita Maria Pichardo (born 22 May 1970) is a Cuban former professional tennis player.

Pichardo, a five-time national champion, represented the Cuba Federation Cup team in 1991 and 1992. She featured in a total of six ties, including a World Group second round matchup against Romania, where she lost her singles rubber in three sets to Irina Spîrlea.

In 1993, while competing in satellite tournaments in Mexico, Pichardo made the decision to defect to the United States and with the help of friends crossed the border at Tijuana on a fake passport.

ITF finals

Singles: 4 (2–2)

Doubles: 9 (6–3)

References

External links
 
 
 

1970 births
Living people
Cuban female tennis players
Defecting sportspeople of Cuba
Central American and Caribbean Games medalists in tennis
Central American and Caribbean Games silver medalists for Cuba
Central American and Caribbean Games bronze medalists for Cuba
Tennis players at the 1991 Pan American Games
Pan American Games competitors for Cuba
20th-century Cuban women
21st-century Cuban women